MohammadReza Alee Payam (born June 10, 1957), also known by his pen name as Halloo, is an Iranian poet and satirist. He has published ten volumes of books of satire poems and more than 10000 of his books are sold in Iran.

He is a film maker and is a member of Iranian Screenwriters Association. One of his movies is called "Ghazian Afghan" which was aired in Iranian national television. During then production of this movie, he spent 2 years in Afghanistan (1980-1982) and lived 7 months in Panjshir Valley with "Ahmad Shah Masoud".

MohammadReza Alee Payam also served as producer in:
"Bicycleran (Cyclist)" directed by Mohsen Makhmalbaf, "Parvaz Az Ordugah", "Delam Baraye Pesaram Tang Shode", "Raze Khanjar", "Khaste Nabashid", and "Mushu".

He has also served as an actor in "Sarbedaran" TV-series and "Jonge Athar" and "Tavahom" movies.
He personally directed 2 movies which are called "Khaste Nabashid" and "Mushu".

Alee Payam also has many experience in the field of screenwriting in the movies: "Parvaz Az Ordugah", "Mushu", and "Khaste Nabashid".
In the movies "Tavahom" and "Sarbedaran" he had the experience of set designing as well.

In the working career of MohammadReza Alee Payam he also produced 80 short films and documentaries. He is a member of screen writers of Iran association and Iran's producers association.
MohammadReza Alee Payam is also a poet and a member of "Amirkabir" and "Parvin Etesami" literature association. He published 10 books of his poems.

Poems 
 Drought (خشکسالى)
 Conversations with Hafez (گفت‌وگو با حافظ)
 Asking for forgiveness
 Die and Hehrie
 Fuel price (قیمت بنزین)

See also
Persian satire

References

External links
 Facebook : Facebook.Haalou.Com
 Poetry Reading 1

21st-century Iranian poets
Persian-language poets
Prisoners and detainees of Iran
Iranian male poets
Living people
1957 births
21st-century male writers
People from Tehran
Poets from Tehran